Samoklęski Duże  is a village in the administrative district of Gmina Szubin, within Nakło County, Kuyavian-Pomeranian Voivodeship, in north-central Poland.

The village has a population of 493.

History

The oldest known mention of the village comes from 1337, when it was part of the Piast-ruled Kingdom of Poland. The Saint Bartholomew Catholic parish was established in the 14th century. Samoklęski Duże was a private village of Polish nobility, administratively located in the Kcynia County in the Kalisz Voivodeship in the Greater Poland Province of the Polish Crown.

References

Villages in Nakło County